Persikas (stands for Persatuan Sepakbola Indonesia Kabupaten Subang) is an Indonesian football club based in Subang, West Java. Club played in Liga 3.

Persikas stadium named Persikas Stadium. Its location was in downtown Subang, West Java. Persikas have been owned by Indonesian feminist Laila Fariha Zein, that bring the aims to be the club which players passionately aspire to be a part of and a club to whom fans pledge their loyalties.

History 
During this Persikas more often play in Division Two and Division Three. This happens because of lack of support from the government to develop and promote achievement in the arena football Persikas West Java, so the achievement Persikas inconspicuous.

Currently, Persikas Subang like suspended animation because it had not followed the national competition by reason of cost, so Persikas Earring only able to send a team at the junior level to be projected on the teams higher level, given the achievements of young players who are very good at the Subang junior.

Stadium 
Laila Fariha Zein Stadium is the home of Persikas Subang, which has a capacity of 5,000 spectators. The stadium is located in downtown Subang. The stadium has become the first stadium that has the same name as the owner that have it.

This is not out of history, where at that moment in its heyday Persikas arena football in West Java. Therefore, use the name of the Laila Fariha Zein Stadium by the team management as a form of love and appreciation of the owner on this team.

Until now, Persikas still use Laila Fariha Zein Stadium to play home games. The stadium is also often used as a training center, a few other teams in West Java, such as Persib Bandung, Persikab Bandung Regency, and Bandung FC during training camp before the start of the competition.

Achievement 
 Senior
 Jabar Djarum Super Cup Winner: 1989

 Junior
 2rd Place U-17 Suratin Cup West Java: 1992
 3rd Place U-15 West Java: 2008
 Champion 2 U-15 West Java: 2009

Famous Players 
Since playing in the national competition, Persikas Subang has had a number of young players who excel in both the team and at the national level. They include:
 Kekey Zakaria  Persib-Bandung
 Anwar Sanusi Persib-Bandung
 Hariman Siregar Persikota-Tangerang
 Enjang Rohiman Persib-Bandung, Persikab
 Eded Harison Sekarbumi FC
 Yana Mulyana Persib-Bandung
 Yudi Heriadi Sekarbumi FC
 Jumono Persikota-Tangerang, Batara FC. Purwakarta
 Aris Subekti Santos FC, PSB Bogor
 Ade Yadi Santos FC
 Yana Heryana Persib-Bandung
 Iwan Poras Djarum Super
 Ratman Sekarbumi FC
 Yayat RuhyatSekarbumi FC
 Ahmed Armed FC
 Elby N Rahardjo Fajarparahiyangan-Gallery FC, Petrokimia Gresik, Persijap-Jepara, Persipasi-Bekasi, Batara FC. Purwakarta

Supporters 
Persikas Subang has a group of fanatical supporters who are scattered throughout the area of Subang Regency, given the historical record as the only club and the pride of Subang Regency society so that every Persikas compete, Persikas Stadium always packed with fans both old and young, women to young children all in one. Persikas fans call themselves as a Super Sub (Supporters United Subang). Where is Super Sub to unify the entire community of Subang district into one without divisions in supporting his favorite team (Persikas).

Derby 
W-IV Derby, or Derby Region IV is a football match between Persipo Purwakarta, Persikas Subang, Persika Karawang, Persikasi Bekasi and Persipasi Bekasi. The name is taken from the history that connects the four cities in earlier times together.

Historically yore Subang is a region of Karawang, because at that time Karawang includes Purwakarta, Subang and Bekasi. so when teams from each city meet always cause high tension in the game, because historically a very close relationship both in terms of culture and cultural.

Derby matches are always happening at the lower level football Indonesia precisely in Second Division and Third Division, as Persikas vs Persipo, Persikas vs Persika and Persikas vs Persikasi and Persipasi or game that brings the other team.

All the games that bring together teams from Region IV is very attractive interest the audience to come to the stadium because the game is running with Derby and prestige of high tension so that this derby game sometimes culminate in a scene players, officials, and spectators.

References

External links

 Media Supporter Indonesia
 Super Sub at Facebook
 Liga-Indonesia site

Subang Regency
Sport in West Java
Football clubs in Indonesia
Football clubs in West Java
Association football clubs established in 1951
1951 establishments in Indonesia